Tamar was a princess of Israel, the daughter of King David and sister of Absalom in 2 Samuel in the Hebrew Bible. In the biblical narrative, she is raped by her half-brother Amnon.

Early life
Tamar was the daughter of King David and Maacah, who was the daughter of Talmai, king of Geshur. Absalom was her brother and Amnon her half-brother. The Bible does not speak of Tamar's early life; however, in 2 Samuel 13, she is wearing a "richly ornamental robe", suggesting she was a virgin and either a priestess or interpreter of dreams.

Rape (2 Samuel 13) 

During Tamar's teenage years, Amnon became obsessed with her, said to be beautiful like her brother, Absalom. Amnon's friend and cousin Jonadab devised a ruse in which Amnon feigned illness and asked King David to fetch Tamar for him, so that she could make him food. King David was not aware of the plot and did what Amnon asked, as David was fond of him, the firstborn son. Tamar obeyed. When she finished her food, Amnon sent the servants in the room away, and pressed Tamar for sex. She refused, citing the Law, but as "he was stronger than she, he raped her". After intercourse, Amnon became angry with Tamar, and mistreated her, yelling at her to leave the room. Tamar pleaded that he marry her, to preserve her reputation, but instead Amnon forced her out of the room. Tamar ripped her robes and went away crying. The news spread throughout the royal household. Absalom her older brother, comforted Tamar, vowing to avenge her rape. When David heard of her rape, he was angered but did nothing. Two years later, Absalom had Amnon murdered, then fled to Geshur.

Absalom's revolt and later life 
After her rape, Tamar left the royal household to live in Absalom's house, where she stayed during his years in exile and Absalom's Revolt (2 Samuel 13-19). During the Revolt, both Absalom's sons were killed, and later Absalom himself. Tamar was left the guardian of her niece, also named Tamar. The Bible mentions that Tamar was left "a desolate woman in her brother's house"; she was grieved and traumatized by her rape. Nothing is known of her later life and death.

In rabbinic literature
The sages of the Mishnah point out that Amnon's love for Tamar, his half-sister, did not arise from true affection, but from passion and lust, on which account, after having attained his desire, he immediately "hated her exceedingly." "All love which depends upon some particular thing ceases when that thing ceases; thus was the love of Amnon for Tamar" (Ab. v. 16). Amnon's love for Tamar was not, however, such a transgression as is usually supposed: for, although she was a daughter of David, her mother was a prisoner of war, who had not yet become Jewish; consequently, Tamar also had not entered the Jewish community (Sanh. 21a). The incident of Amnon and Tamar was utilized by the sages as affording justification for their rule that a man must on no account remain alone in the company of a woman, not even of an unmarried one (Sanh. l.c. et seq.).

According to the Babylonian Talmud, Amnon's hatred of Tamar was because the contact of his manhood with her hair had caused him to become a eunuch, and his death was a punishment from the Lord for his actions.

Scholarly discussion

Michael D. Coogan attributes the placement of the rape of Tamar narrative, coming soon after the Bathsheba narrative, as a way for the narrator to compare Amnon to David. As David wronged Bathsheba, so too will Amnon wrong Tamar, "like father like son."<ref name="Coog">Coogan, Michael D. A Brief Introduction to the Old Testament.. (Oxford University Press: 2009), 212.</ref> Mark Gray, however, disagrees with Coogan on this point, arguing that "the rape of Tamar is an act of such horrific defilement that it is marked off as distinct from David's encounter with Bathsheba."

Mary J. Evans describes Tamar as a "beautiful, good-hearted, obedient, righteous daughter who is totally destroyed by her family." After the rape, Amnon attempted to send Tamar away. She responded "No, my brother; for this wrong in sending me away is greater than the other that you did to me".

In Biblical law, it was unlawful for a man to have intercourse with his sister. Rav says that Tamar was not, by Biblical law, David's daughter, nor Amnon's sister. Tamar, was the earlier born daughter of David's wife, and thus not biologically related to David, nor Amnon. Coogan says that, according to the Bible, it was possible for Amnon to marry Tamar. Kyle McCarter suggests that either the laws are not in effect at this time or will be overlooked by David, or they do not apply to the royal family.

Coogan, in his section on women in 2 Samuel, describes Tamar as a "passive figure" whose story is "narrated with considerable pathos." Coogan also points out the poignancy of the image at the end of the narrative story where Tamar is left as a "desolate woman in her brother Absalom's house". It is thought that this ending verse about Tamar is meant to elicit compassion and pity for her.

Adrien Bledstein says the description of Tamar as wearing a "richly ornamented robe" may have been meant to signify that she was a priestess or interpreter of dreams, like Joseph with his coat of many colors.

Feminist critique of 2 Samuel 13
Feminist scholars have spent time exploring the character of Tamar, her relationships with her male family members and her experience of rape.

In The Cry of Tamar: Violence Against Women and the Church's Response, Episcopal priest Pamela Cooper-White argues that Tamar's story has a direct message for the church in its response to violence against women. The narrative of Tamar's rape at the hands of her half-brother is told with a focus that emphasizes the male roles of the story: David, Amnon, and Absalom. "Even the poignancy of Tamar's humiliation is drawn out for the primary purpose of justifying Absalom's later murder of Amnon, and not for its own sake" (p. 5).

In focusing on the story of Tamar, rather than on the men, Cooper-White reminds readers that the lesson should come from the true victim: the female who was raped, not the men left to deal with the situation. She emphasizes "power-within" instead of "power-over." With "power-over", one's power is related to how many creatures one has dominion over. Tamar, however, demonstrates the "power-within", or en-theos (God-within), by resisting as much as she could Amnon's attack and subsequent banishment.

Throughout her book, Cooper-White elaborates on the different kinds of violence women often face, and also strongly critiques the church response of forgiveness for the perpetrators at the expense of the victim. She concludes that the lesson learned from Tamar is that women, and women victims, must be empowered within themselves with the full support of the Christian church.

Feminist literary critic Phyllis Trible dedicates a chapter in her book, Texts of Terror: Literary-Feminist Readings of Biblical Narratives, to the rape of Tamar, or what she calls "The Royal Rape of Wisdom". Trible gives a comprehensive literary critique of the text, highlighting the patterns that reiterate the power struggle between the characters and the vulnerability of Tamar, the sole female in the narrative.

Trible argues, for example, that when Tamar is finally given a voice (she is speechless for the first 11 verses of the narrative), "the narrator hints at her powerlessness by avoiding her name". (p. 46). The words of Jonadab, Amnon, Absalom and David are consistently introduced by the proper name of each. However, the first time Tamar speaks the narrator prefaces it passively, using the pronoun 'she'. Trible says that "this subtle difference suggests the plight of the female" (p. 46).

Trible does not focus only on the plight of Tamar, but also on her apparent wisdom and eye for justice. She points to Tamar's request that Amnon simply "speak to the king, for he will not keep (Tamar) from (Amnon)" (13:13). Trible argues that "her words are honest and poignant; they acknowledge female servitude" (p. 45). That is, Tamar is wise to her place in the world and willing to work within it. Even after Amnon violently rapes her, she continues to plead for justice and proper order, not letting anger cloud her judgment (p. 46).

Literary references
Georg Christian Lehms, Des israelitischen Printzens Absolons und seiner Prinzcessin Schwester Thamar Staats- Lebens- und Helden-Geschichte (The Heroic Life and History of the Israelite Prince Absolom and his Princess Sister Tamar), novel in German published in Nuremberg, 1710
 The Spanish poet Federico García Lorca wrote a poem about Amnon's rape of his sister Tamar, included in Lorca's 1928 poetry collection Romancero Gitano (translated as Gypsy Ballads). Lorca's version is considerably different from the Biblical original – Amnon is depicted as being overcome by a sudden uncontrollable passion, with none of the cynical planning and premeditation of the original story. He assaults and rapes Tamar and then flees into the night on his horse, with archers shooting at him from the walls – whereupon King David cuts the strings of his harp.The Rape of Tamar, novel by Dan Jacobson
 The Death of Amnon poem by Elizabeth Hands
 Yonadab, play by Peter Shaffer (1985, revised 1988)
 In Stefan Heym's 1973 "The King David Report", the East German writer's wry depiction of a court historian writing an "authorized" history of King David's reign, a chapter is devoted to the protagonist's interview with Tamar – who is described as having gone insane as a result of her traumatic experience.La venganza de Tamar (Tamar's Revenge), theater play by Spanish author Tirso de Molina.
 In the novel The Book of Tamar by Nel Havas, the revolt of Absalom is presented from the viewpoint of his sister.  While closely following the main events as related in the Bible, Havas concentrates on the motives behind Absalom's actions, which are more complex than depicted in the scriptures.  The rape of his sister is used by him as a cause celebre'' in his ambition to advance himself.

References

Notes

External links

11th-century BCE Hebrew people
10th-century BCE Hebrew people
11th-century BC women
10th-century BC women
Ancient princesses
Women in the Hebrew Bible
Children of David
Judaism and sexuality
Incestual abuse
Mythological rape victims
Incest in mythology